Chaetomitrium elegans is a species of mosses in the genus Chaetomitrium and family Symphyodontaceae.

References

External links

Hypnales
Plants described in 1889